Grate firing is a type of industrial combustion system used for solid fuels. It now is used mainly for burning waste and biomass, but also for smaller coal furnaces.

 Capacities 0.3 to 175 MWth in industry and CHP
 Fuel fired per grate area 1-2 MW/m2, maximum grate area 100 m2
 Grates are typical only suitable for coarse particles, for fine particles a spreader is required, increases max. capacity
 Primary air through the grate (also used for cooling) and secondary air

Types

Travelling grate
A moving grate which is covered with a fuel layer, 10-30 cm. Power control by means of varying the grate velocity

Reciprocating grate
For ash-rich, low calorific fuels like municipal waste, arrangement of stationary and moving grates -> conveying and mixing (forward-moving type or reverse-action grate)

Vibrating grate
Water cooled membrane wall, with holes for air. For burning coal or wood.

Grate area
The grate area is the area of the grate (length x width). The larger the grate area, the more fuel can be burned per hour. The amount of fuel burned also depends on the fuel or bed movement velocity.

See also
 Fluidised bed firing
 Pulverized fuel firing

Energy conversion